The Serbian First League (Serbian: Prva liga Srbije) is the second-highest football league in Serbia. The league is operated by the Serbian FA. 16 teams compete in the league for the 2018–19 season.

Format 2018–19
As of the 2018-19 season, the league reverted to its previous playoff system, whereby the top 8 placed teams compete in the promoted round at the end of the season and the 8 lowest placed teams play in the relegation playoff round. The four bottom placed teams are relegated to the Serbian League. 
The Fourteenth team from Super League is then sent to a playoff against the winner of the First League play off. At the end of the season, the top two teams and the winner of the play-offs are promoted to the Super League. The First League play-offs is a knock-out competition for the teams finishing the season in third to sixth place with the winner being promoted to the Super League. In the play-offs, the third-placed team plays against the sixth-placed team and the fourth-placed team plays against the fifth-placed team.

Team changes
The following teams have changed division since the 2017–18 season.

To First League
Promoted from Serbian League
 Žarkovo
 Trayal Kruševac
 Bečej
 Zlatibor

Relegated from Serbian SuperLiga
 Borac Čačak
 Javor

From First League
Relegated to Serbian League
 ČSK
 Jagodina
 Radnički Pirot
 Temnić 1924

Promoted to Serbian SuperLiga
 Dinamo Vranje
 Proleter Novi Sad

2018–19 teams

Transfers
For the list of transfers involving First League clubs during 2018–19 season, please see: List of Serbian football transfers summer 2018 and List of Serbian football transfers winter 2018–19.

Regular season

League table

Results

Play-offs

Promotion round
The top eight teams advanced from the regular season. Points from the regular season were halved with half points rounded up. Teams played each other once.

League table

Results

Relegation round
The bottom eight teams from the regular season play in the relegation round. Points from the regular season are halved with half points rounded up. Teams play each other once.

League table

Results

Promotion play-off

Semi-finals

Final

Individual statistics

Top goalscorers
As of matches played on 5 May 2019.

Hat-tricks

References

External links
 Official website
 srbijasport.net

Serbian First League seasons
2018–19 in Serbian football leagues
Serbia